Hualaihué is a Chilean commune located in Palena Province, Los Lagos Region. The communal capital is the town of Hornopirén.

Demographics
Of these, 2,406 (29.1%) lived in urban areas and 5,867 (70.9%) in rural areas. The population grew by 2.1% (169 persons) between the 1992 and 2002 censuses.

Administration
As a commune, Hualaihué is a third-level administrative division of Chile administered by a municipal council, headed by an alcalde who is directly elected every four years. The 2008-2012 alcalde is Freddy Ibacache Muñoz (PPD).

Within the electoral divisions of Chile, Hualaihué is represented in the Chamber of Deputies by Gabriel Ascencio (PDC) and Alejandro Santana (RN) as part of the 58th electoral district, together with Castro, Ancud, Quemchi, Dalcahue, Curaco de Vélez, Quinchao, Puqueldón, Chonchi, Queilén, Quellón, Chaitén, Futaleufú and Palena. The commune is represented in the Senate by Camilo Escalona Medina (PS) and Carlos Kuschel Silva (RN) as part of the 17th senatorial constituency (Los Lagos Region).

References

External links
  Municipality of Hualaihué

Communes of Chile